Cvetkovski is a Macedonian-language surname. It may refer to:
 Andrej Cvetkovski, Macedonian basketball player
 Jane Cvetkovski, Macedonian handball player
 Michael Cvetkovski, Macedonian-Australian footballer

Macedonian-language surnames